Emmanuel Osei Baffour (born 4 June 1994) is a Ghanaian football midfielder who plays for Ashanti Gold.

References

1994 births
Living people
Ghanaian footballers
Ghana international footballers
Ashanti Gold SC players
Karela United FC players
Association football midfielders
People from Obuasi